Jaime Santos Colado (born 27 April 1995) is a Spanish professional footballer who plays for San Fernando as a winger.

Career

Spain
Born in Oviedo, Asturias, Santos joined the youth setup of Sporting de Gijón in 2002. On 24 August 2014, he made his debut for the reserves, coming on as a substitute for Juan Mera in a 3–1 defeat against Real Oviedo, in Segunda División B. On 2 December 2015, his contract was extended until June 2018.

On 9 August 2017, Santos joined CD Mirandés on a one-year deal.

East Bengal
On 23 November 2018, he moved abroad and signed for Indian club East Bengal. Jaime debuted for East Bengal FC on 16 December 2018 in the all important Kolkata Derby against the arch-rivals Mohun Bagan which East Bengal FC won 3–2. Jaime did not score but was impressive with his performance in front of a sell-out crowd. Jaime got his first goal in the very next match against Churchill Brothers S.C. when he volleyed in a Lalrindika Ralte's corner from outside the box to the bottom corner to equalize the match.
On 27 January 2019, Jaime Santos scored the opening goal in the return leg of the Kolkata Derby which East Bengal FC won 2–0, hence completing a double over their arch-rivals Mohun Bagan since 2003–04. In the 2018–19 I-League season, Jaime scored 5 goals in total, helping East Bengal FC finish runners-up to Chennai City F.C. by just 1 point.

On 12 June 2019, East Bengal FC announced the contract extension for 2 years for Jaime Santos, keeping him at the club till 2021.

San Fernando
On 16 February 2022, Santos signed with San Fernando in the third-tier Primera División RFEF.

Club statistics

References

External links

1995 births
Living people
People from Oviedo
Spanish footballers
Footballers from Asturias
Association football wingers
Sporting de Gijón B players
CD Mirandés footballers
East Bengal Club players
C.D. Palmaflor del Trópico players
San Fernando CD players
Segunda División B players
Tercera División players
I-League players
Calcutta Football League players
Bolivian Primera División players
Spanish expatriate footballers
Spanish expatriate sportspeople in India
Expatriate footballers in India
Spanish expatriate sportspeople in Bolivia
Expatriate footballers in Bolivia